Sacred Music is a documentary series broadcast on BBC Four and BBC Two from 2008. Presented by actor and former chorister Simon Russell Beale, it is produced in conjunction with The Open University and features performances and interviews by Harry Christophers and his choir, The Sixteen.

Regular episodes

Series 1

Series 2

Specials

Release and reception

Home Media
Most episodes have been released on DVD under The Sixteen's own label, Coro.

References

External links
 
 
 http://www.open2.net/sacredmusic/index.html

2008 British television series debuts
2015 British television series endings
2000s British music television series
2010s British music television series
BBC high definition shows
BBC Television shows
English-language television shows